Midway is the name of some places in the U.S. state of Florida:
Midway, Gadsden County, Florida
Midway, Hillsborough County, Florida, a place in Florida
Midway, Lafayette County, Florida, Lafayette County, Florida
Midway, Santa Rosa County, Florida
Midway, Seminole County, Florida